Prof Paul Sabatier FRS(For) HFRSE (5 November 1854 – 14 August 1941) was a French chemist, born in Carcassonne.  In 1912, Sabatier was awarded the Nobel Prize in Chemistry along with Victor Grignard.  Sabatier was honoured for his work improving the hydrogenation of organic species in the presence of metals.

Education

Sabatier studied at the École Normale Supérieure, starting in 1874.  Three years later, he graduated at the top of his class.  In 1880, he was awarded a Doctor of Science degree from the College de France.

In 1883 Sabatier succeeded Édouard Filhol at the Faculty of Science, and began a long collaboration with Jean-Baptiste Senderens, so close that it was impossible to distinguish the work of either man.
They jointly published 34 notes in the Accounts of the Academy of Science, 11 memoirs in the Bulletin of the French Chemical Society and 2 joint memoirs to the Annals of Chemistry and Physics.
The methanation reactions of COx were first discovered by Sabatier and Senderens in 1902.
Sabatier and Senderen shared the Academy of Science's Jecker Prize in 1905 for their discovery of the Sabatier–Senderens Process.

After 1905–06 Senderens and Sabatier published few joint works, perhaps due to the classic problem of recognition of the merit of contributions to joint work.
Sabatier taught science classes most of his life before he became Dean of the Faculty of Science at the University of Toulouse in 1905.

Research
Sabatier's earliest research concerned the thermochemistry of sulfur and metallic sulfates, the subject for the thesis leading to his doctorate. In Toulouse, he continued his physical and chemical investigations to sulfides, chlorides, chromates and copper compounds. He also studied the oxides of nitrogen and nitrosodisulfonic acid and its salts and carried out fundamental research on partition coefficients and absorption spectra.  Sabatier greatly facilitated the industrial use of hydrogenation. In 1897, building on the recent biochemical work of the American chemist, James Boyce, he discovered that the introduction of a trace amount of nickel (as a catalyst) facilitated the addition of hydrogen to molecules of most carbon compounds.

The reduction of carbon dioxide using hydrogen at high temperature and pressure is another use of nickel catalyst to produce methane. This is called the Sabatier reaction and is used in the International Space Station to produce the necessary water without relying on stock from the earth.

∆H = −165.0 kJ/mol
(some initial energy/heat is required to start the reaction)
Sabatier is best known for the Sabatier process and his works such as La Catalyse en Chimie Organique (Catalysis in organic chemistry) which was published in 1913. He won the Nobel Prize in Chemistry jointly with fellow Frenchman Victor Grignard in 1912. He is also known for the Sabatier principle of catalysis.

Personal life

Sabatier was married with four daughters, one of whom wed the Italian chemist Emilio Pomilio.

The Paul Sabatier University in Toulouse is named in honour of Paul Sabatier, as is one of Carcassonne's high schools. Paul Sabatier was a co-founder of the Annales de la Faculté des Sciences de Toulouse, together with the mathematician Thomas Joannes Stieltjes.

Sabatier died on 14 August, 1941 in Toulouse at the age of 86.

See also
Timeline of hydrogen technologies

References

External links

  including the Nobel Lecture, December 11, 1912 The Method of Direct Hydrogenation by Catalysis

1854 births
1941 deaths
People from Carcassonne
Lycée Pierre-de-Fermat alumni
Academic staff of the University of Bordeaux
Academic staff of the University of Toulouse
Foreign Members of the Royal Society
Foreign associates of the National Academy of Sciences
Members of the French Academy of Sciences
20th-century French chemists
Nobel laureates in Chemistry
French Nobel laureates
French Roman Catholics
Inorganic chemists
École Normale Supérieure alumni
Commandeurs of the Légion d'honneur
19th-century French chemists